Stonecipher is a surname. Notable people with the surname include:

Donna Stonecipher (fl. since 1992), American poet
Harry Stonecipher (born 1936), American chief executive

See also 
 Stonesifer